Östanå is a ferry port in the municipality of Österåker in the Swedish county of Stockholm. It is the mainland terminal of the  vehicle ferry route to the island of Ljusterö, operated by Trafikverket, and is also a calling point for the passenger ferries of the Waxholmbolaget on its routes from the city of Stockholm to the northern part of the Stockholm archipelago. 

References

Österåker Municipality